DePuy Spring Creek is a three mile long trout fishery located between the Absaroka and Gallatin mountain ranges in Paradise Valley, south of Livingston, Montana. The creek is a small tributary of the Yellowstone River. This fishery supports a population of brown, Yellowstone cutthroat and rainbow trout.

References

Notes

Rivers of Montana
Rivers of Park County, Montana
Tributaries of the Yellowstone River